Jean-Pierre Coffe (24 March 1938 – 29 March 2016) was a French radio and television presenter, food critic, and author.

Early life and education 
Jean-Pierre Coffe spent a major part of his childhood in the town where he was born, Lunéville. He never knew his father, mobilized in 1937 and killed on the field of battle in 1940. He was raised by his mother, who took over the family hairdressing salon. His grandmother was a cook and his grandfather a market gardener.

His mother left Lorraine for Paris where he studied at boarding school. At the age of 13, he was seized by a passion for theatre. After completing his studies, he took classes at the Cours Simon and had a number of small jobs at the same time.

Television career 
Jean-Pierre Coffe then began a career in television in the early 1980s. He joined Canal+ on November 4, 1984, and appeared on a number of occasions in the programs hosted by Michel Denisot. In 1992 and 1993, he made his first appearances in La Grande Famille hosted by Jean-Luc Delarue and Demain hosted by Michel Denisot for the cooking theme.

He then joined the French public television channels where he hosted a cooking program with children titled Comment c'est fait ? ("How is it done?") from 1992 to 1993 on France 3, followed in 1994 by C'est tout Coffe ("This is all Coffe") on France 2. He joined private channel TF1 in 1999 to present Bien jardiner ("Gardening well"), produced by Jean-Luc Delarue, who finally decided to end the broadcast soon after, which marked the end of their friendship. In 2003, he joined Michel Drucker on France 2 where he served as a food critic in the program Vivement dimanche prochain. On 5 September 2012 he announced his departure of the program to spend more time on writing.

Radio career 
In September 1990 he joined the team of Les Grosses Têtes, a radio program hosted by Philippe Bouvard on RTL, for which he became a regular participant. He left in September 2010 and soon after joined the program On va s'gêner, hosted by Laurent Ruquier on Europe 1, which he left after one season in 2011. In 2014, he returned to Les Grosses Têtes on RTL when Laurent Ruquier took over as presenter. From 1998 to June 2008, he presented the program Ça se bouffe pas, ça se mange on France Inter every Saturday. At the end of the show on June 21, 2008, he announced his forced retirement by France Inter management.

Advertisement 
In 1997, he appeared in advertising spots for the appliance manufacturer Siemens. In 2001, he appeared in advertising spots for Weight Watchers.

In 2009, as a defender of healthy and natural food, he became famous for appearing on poster campaigns for the hard discount store brand Leader Price.

Books
Coffe published many books, ranging from recipes and gardening, to critiques of mass-produced food production and the manufacture of commercial food products. Some of his best-sellers were:
 Le Bon Vivre (Living Well) and Le Vrai Vivre (Authentic Living) in 1992,
 Comme à la Maison (Homely cooking) in 1993,
 Le Potager Plaisir (The Joy of Home-grown Food) and Le Marché (The Food Market) in 1998,
 Fleurs Bonheur (The Joy of Flowers) in 1999,
 Le Verger Gourmand (The Greedy Gardener) in 2000,
 La Véritable Histoire des Jardins de Versailles (The True History of the Gardens of Versailles), with Alain Baraton in 2007,
 Les Recettes Inratables de Jean-Pierre Coffe (Jean-Pierre Coffe's Failure-proof Recipes) in 2007,
 Mes Confitures (My Jams) in 2008, and 
 Le Plaisir à Petit Prix (Good Food on a Budget) in 2009.

Private life

Jean-Pierre Coffe was a private individual, however he has declared his bisexuality publicly, notably in 2011 during an interview with MFM Radio and in 2013 during France 2's programme La parenthèse inattendue.

Married three times to women, Jean-Pierre Coffe lived his final years with a man, whom he declared himself ready to marry in 2013.

Jean-Pierre Coffe had a son who died shortly after birth and a step-daughter who died aged 35.

Death 
On 29 March 2016, Coffe died at his home in Lanneray.

Filmography

Honors 
 Chevalier (Knight) of the Legion of Honour
 Commander of the Order of Agricultural Merit

References

External links 

 Official site of Jean-Pierre Coffe

1938 births
2016 deaths
French radio presenters
French television presenters
French food writers
People from Lunéville
French male non-fiction writers
French LGBT broadcasters
Chevaliers of the Légion d'honneur
French LGBT writers